The Luz A Salento Foundation is an organization that works for the arts of the small town of Salento, Quindío in Colombia. This organization was created in 2002 in a community that lack for opportunities for kids and youth. Based in Salento the organization serves children between 4 and 16 years old from different origins and family challenges. The board of directors is formed by 7 members plus a supportive group of 24 associates, all of them working as volunteers.

History
Luz Amelia Henao de Olier was a visionary. The idea of having an organization that offered opportunities to youngsters of Salento, came during one of the many afternoons she expended in her small business in that town. She would think of ideas of how to take advantage of all the time those kids had. She died without seen her dream realized, then her husband, children, and friends created the foundation in her memory.

Funds
Since its beginning funding for teachers’ payroll, rent, and services has been provided by volunteers and private founders. With these founds the foundation tries to accomplish its social and particular objectives of bring an opportunity to children to have a healthy and productive life.

Activities
The music and arts education is the main activity of the foundation. Today it serves 70 kids of different ages. They begin with the pre-orchestra program and end with the symphonic. The foundation members believe is that if these young kids take an instrument in their hands, that instrument will never be changed for a weapon.

Instruments taught
Violin – Cello – Transverse flute – Clarinet – Percussion – Piano

Events
 Concerts - A series of concerts have been realized in the Quindío region. Among the cities that the orchestra has visited are: Filandia, Circasia, Barcelona, Quimbaya, and Armenia.

References

External links
 Luz A Salento Website  
 Facebook Group

Charities based in Colombia